Urocoptoidea is a superfamily of land snails, gastropods in the suborder Helicina.

Families 
In 2005, according to the taxonomy of the Gastropoda by Bouchet & Rocroi, the families Urocoptidae and Cerionidae were classified within the superfamily Orthalicoidea .

In 2008, the superfamily Urocoptoidea was established by the malacologist Uit de Weerd, based on molecular phylogeny research.

In 2012, Thompson established a new family, the Epirobiidae.

Families
 Cerionidae Pilsbry, 1901
 Epirobiidae Thompson, 2012
 Eucalodiidae P. Fischer & Crosse, 1873
 Holospiridae Pilsbry, 1946
 Urocoptidae Pilsbry, 1898 (1868)

References

 Bouchet P., Rocroi J.P., Hausdorf B., Kaim A., Kano Y., Nützel A., Parkhaev P., Schrödl M. & Strong E.E. (2017). Revised classification, nomenclator and typification of gastropod and monoplacophoran families. Malacologia. 61(1-2): 1-526

External links 

Stylommatophora